Jinfeng is a town under the administration of Kaizhou District, Chongqing, China. , it has one residential community and 6 villages under its administration.

References 

Township-level divisions of Chongqing